Ismail Amat (September 1935 – 16 October 2018) was a Chinese politician of Uyghur ethnicity who served as Chairman (Governor) of Xinjiang Uyghur Autonomous Region, State Councillor, Vice-Chairman of the National People's Congress and Vice-Chairman of the Chinese People's Political Consultative Conference (CPPCC). 

He was among the highest-ranking Uyghur politicians sitting for decades in the Central Government of People's Republic of China between 1979–2008.

Early life and career in Xinjiang 
Ismail was born 1935 in Qira County, Hotan Prefecture, Xinjiang Province, Republic of China. His parents were poor Uyghur peasants. From 1952 to 1954, he took part in the land reform movement in his hometown and joined the Communist Party of China (CPC) in 1953. He rose quickly in the government of Qira and became the county magistrate in 1954 at the age of 19.

In 1960, he was selected to study in Beijing at the Central Party School of the CPC for two years. After returning to Xinjiang, he became deputy publicity head of Hotan Prefecture in 1963.

During the Cultural Revolution, Ismail was elevated to the regional government of Xinjiang in 1969 and elected to the 10th Central Committee of the CPC in 1972. From 1971 to 1979 he served as Xinjiang's party secretary (then subordinate to the first secretary) and director of its Organization Department.

In 1979, he became Chairman (Governor) of Xinjiang Uyghur Autonomous Region at the age of 44. During his six-year tenure, he oversaw Xinjiang's transition to a market economy in Deng Xiaoping's reform and opening era.

Career in the national government 
In 1986, Ismail was elevated to the national government and became Minister of the State Ethnic Affairs Commission, a key position in charge of affairs concerning ethnic minorities, especially the Tibetans and Muslim groups such as the Uyghurs. As a prominent Muslim CPC leader, he served as a mouthpiece of China's ethnic policies and condemned separatist movements. He served in the position until 1998, and concurrently as vice-chairman of the Chinese People's Political Consultative Conference (CPPCC) from 1988 to 1993. From 1993 to 2003 he also served as a vice-premier-level State Councillor. During his tenure there were multiple anti-Chinese protests in Xinjiang which were suppressed by the government. Amat supported the official policy of harshly treating ethnic separatists while promoting economic growth and stability in minority regions.

From 2003 to 2008 Ismail served as vice-chairman of the 10th National People's Congress. As one of the highest-ranking Uyghur or Muslim politicians in the history of the People's Republic of China, he frequently visited Central Asian nations and met with visiting dignitaries from Islamic countries.

After the September 11 attacks in 2001, the United States captured a number of Chinese Uyghurs in the War in Afghanistan and held them in the Guantanamo Bay detention camp. China considered the Uyghur detainees terrorists and demanded that the US hand them over to Chinese custody. When the demand was refused, Ismail condemned the US in 2006.

Ismail served as a member of seven consecutive CPC Central Committees, from the 10th to the 16th, spanning 45 years.

Death 
Ismail Amat died on 16 October 2018 in Beijing, at the age of 83. He was buried at the Babaoshan Revolutionary Cemetery. Chinese Communist Party general secretary Xi Jinping, Vice President Wang Qishan, Party former General Secretary Hu Jintao, other Party Politburo Standing Committee members Li Zhanshu, Wang Yang, Wang Huning, Zhao Leji, Han Zheng and many other top leaders attended his funeral.

References 

1935 births
2018 deaths
People from Hotan
Uyghurs
Chinese Communist Party politicians from Xinjiang
People's Republic of China politicians from Xinjiang
Political office-holders in Xinjiang
State councillors of China
Members of the 10th Central Committee of the Chinese Communist Party
Members of the 11th Central Committee of the Chinese Communist Party
Members of the 12th Central Committee of the Chinese Communist Party
Members of the 13th Central Committee of the Chinese Communist Party
Members of the 14th Central Committee of the Chinese Communist Party
Members of the 15th Central Committee of the Chinese Communist Party
Members of the 16th Central Committee of the Chinese Communist Party
Vice Chairpersons of the National People's Congress
Vice Chairpersons of the National Committee of the Chinese People's Political Consultative Conference